Maurice P. Terry Sr. (June 29, 1946 – December 10, 2015) was an American journalist associated with researching theories of the Son of Sam killings.

Early career
A graduate at Iona College, he worked as an in-house editor at IBM after his reports on the MLK assassination.

The Ultimate Evil
He is known for writing the 1987 book The Ultimate Evil, positing an alternative theory for the Son of Sam murders, that it was a satanic cult of serial killers rather than only David Berkowitz.

Legacy
He, his preserved archives, audio tapes, and his book were used as the basis for the Netflix documentary series The Sons of Sam: A Descent Into Darkness.

See also
Satanic panic
Charles Manson
Conspiracy theory

References

1946 births
2015 deaths
American journalists
American conspiracy theorists
David Berkowitz
Iona University alumni
20th-century American journalists
21st-century American journalists
20th-century American non-fiction writers
Place of birth missing
Place of death missing